AOA Cream is a subgroup of the South Korean girl group AOA, formed by FNC Entertainment in 2016. It is originally composed three of  AOA members: Yuna, Hyejeong and Chanmi. Yuna left the group in January 2021. The group is notable for their debut single, I'm Jelly Baby.

History
During early 2016, FNC Entertainment announced the formation of the subgroup. In early February of the same year, the label began providing teasers of the members on their upcoming debut. In 2016, they were featured in Cosmopolitan.

Their debut single, "I'm Jelly Baby", was released on February 11, 2016. The single peaked at No. 26 on the Korean Gaon charts. In late 2019, the group performed the single on the TV show Queendom.

On January 1, 2021, FNC Entertainment announced that Yuna's contract had expired, and that she would be leaving the company.

Discography

Singles

References

K-pop music groups
Musical groups established in 2016
South Korean dance music groups
South Korean girl groups
Musical groups from Seoul
FNC Entertainment artists
2016 establishments in South Korea
Vocal trios
South Korean musical trios